After the Darkness may refer to:

Sidney Sheldon's After the Darkness, a 2010 novel by Tilly Bagshawe
Paglipas ng Dilim (After the Darkness), a 1920 play by Precioso Palma

See also
After Darkness (disambiguation)